USS Maine (SSBN-741) is a United States Navy  ballistic missile submarine in commission since 1995. She is the fourth U.S. Navy ship authorized, and the third commissioned, to be named in honor of the state of Maine. She has the capability to carry 24 nuclear armed Trident ballistic missiles.

Construction and commissioning
The contract to build Maine was awarded to the Electric Boat Division of the General Dynamics Corporation, Groton, Connecticut, on 5 October 1988, and her keel was laid there on 3 July 1990.  Maine was launched on 16 July 1994, delivered to the U.S. Navy on 23 June 1995, and commissioned on 29 July 1995 at the Portsmouth Navy Yard, on the shore of its namesake state.

Service history

Maine has been homeported at Naval Base Kitsap, Bangor, Washington since December 2005. Prior to this, she was homeported at Naval Submarine Base Kings Bay from August 1995 until December 2005.

Maine in fiction
 Maine plays a major role in Tom Clancy's novel The Sum of All Fears.

References

External links

Ships built in Groton, Connecticut
Ohio-class submarines
Nuclear submarines of the United States Navy
1994 ships
Submarines of the United States